Galaxy Television was the first privately registered television station in Nigeria.

Galaxy started full broadcasting in May 1994 from the hills of Oke-Are, Ibadan with 10 kilowatts Areodyne transmitter.

For about nine years, the station has maintained between 60 - 75% viewership in Oyo State and the neighboring Osun and Ogun States. In January 2002, the station established a second Galaxy Television Station (Channel 27) in Lagos to ensure full coverage of the Western States.

See also
List of television stations in Nigeria

External links
Official Site
Lyngsat Official Site
 National Broadcasting Commission Official Site

Television stations in Nigeria
Mass media in Ibadan
Television stations in Lagos
Companies based in Ibadan
Television channels and stations established in 1994